Justo Javier Meza (born July 19, 1967 in Asunción, Paraguay) is a former Paraguayan footballer who played for clubs of Paraguay and Chile.

Teams
  Olimpia 1989-1990
  Sol de América 1991
  Cerro Porteño 1992-1998
  Deportes Puerto Montt 1999
  Santiago Wanderers 2000
  Sol de América 2001-2002

Titles
  Olimpia 1989 (Paraguayan Primera División Championship), 1990 (Copa Libertadores and Supercopa)
  Sol de América 1991 (Paraguayan Primera División Championship)
  Cerro Porteño 1992, 1994 and 1996 (Paraguayan Primera División Championship)

External links
 Justo Javier Meza at playmakerstats.com (English version of ceroacero.es)

1967 births
Living people
Paraguayan footballers
Paraguayan expatriate footballers
Club Olimpia footballers
Cerro Porteño players
Club Sol de América footballers
Puerto Montt footballers
Santiago Wanderers footballers
Chilean Primera División players
Expatriate footballers in Chile
Association footballers not categorized by position